The War Commemorative Cross is a military award of the Netherlands. The medal was established to commemorate service to the Kingdom of the Netherlands during World War II. The medal was established on 16 March 1944 by royal decree of Queen Wilhelmina.

Appearance
The medal is an irregular bronze cross with concave ends on the arms. The obverse bears a central portrait of Queen Wilhelmina of the Netherlands encircled by a fastened garter. On the garter are the words VOOR KRIJCSVERRICHTINGEN (FOR MILITARY OPERATIONS). The arms of the cross bear the royal monogram of Queen Wilhelmina with an oak wreath between the arms of the cross. The reverse is plain.

Clasps
When the cross was established in 1944, the following clasps were initially awarded:

General Military Operations
 KRIJG TER ZEE 1940-1944
 OORLOGSVLUCHTEN 1940-1944
 OORLOGSDIENST-KOOPVAARDIJ 1940-1944
 OORLOGSDIENST-VISSERIJ 1940-1944
 KRIJG TER LAND 1940-1944

Special Military Operations
 NEDERLAND MEI 1940
 NEDERLANDSCH-INDIË 1941-1942
 JAVA-ZEE 1941-1942
 NOORD-AFRIKA-ITALIË 1942-1944

In 1947, a revised royal decree was promulgated and new clasps were announced in the Official Gazette No I 6 on 6 January 1948:

General Military Operations
 KRIJG TER ZEE 1940-1945
 OORLOGSVLUCHTEN 1940-1945
 OORLOGSDIENST-KOOPVAARDIJ 1940-1945
 OORLOGSDIENST-VISSERIJ 1940-1945
 KRIJG TE LAND 1940-1945

Special Military Operations
 NEDERLAND MEI 1940
 NEDERLANDS-INDIË 1941-1942
 JAVAZEE 1941-1942
 MIDDELLANDSE ZEE 1940-1945 (replaced NOORD-AFRIKA-ITALIË 1942-1944)
 ARNHEM–NIJMEGEN–WALCHEREN 1944
 NORMANDIË 1944
 OOST-AZIË–ZUID-PACIFIC 1942-1945

References

Military awards and decorations of the Netherlands